National Pingtung Institute of Commerce (NPIC) was a public higher education located in Pingtung City, Pingtung County, Taiwan.

History
NPIC was established on 1 July 1991. On 1 July 1998, NPIC was upgraded to a degree-awarding university-level institute. On 1 August 2014, it was merged with National Pingtung University of Education to form National Pingtung University.

Faculty
 Business Cluster
 Management Cluster
 Information Management Cluster
 Language Cluster

See also
 List of universities in Taiwan

References

1991 establishments in Taiwan
2014 disestablishments in Taiwan
Defunct universities and colleges in Taiwan
Educational institutions disestablished in 2014
Educational institutions established in 1991